Daniel García Rodríguez (born 21 September 1987), commonly known as Toti, is a Spanish footballer who plays as an attacking midfielder for CD Guijuelo.

Club career
Toti was born in Salamanca, Castile and León. A UD Salamanca youth graduate, he made his senior debut with the reserves in 2005–06, in Tercera División, while still a junior; he appeared with the main squad in the same season, playing six games as they returned to Segunda División at the first attempt.

Toti featured in his first match as a professional on 16 June 2007, coming on as a late substitute in a 1–0 home win against Ciudad de Murcia. He was definitely promoted to the first team in August, and scored his first goal on 8 June of the following year, the second of a 3–1 home victory over RC Celta de Vigo.

In August 2011, after suffering relegation from the second division, Toti signed for Granada CF and was immediately loaned to Segunda División B's Cádiz CF. On 31 August of the following year, he joined Hércules CF of the second tier also in a temporary deal.

On 30 August 2013, Toti moved to fellow league team Deportivo Alavés in a season-long loan. On 10 July of the following year, after appearing in 31 competitive matches and scoring four goals, he signed permanently for the club.

Honours
Salamanca
Segunda División B: 2005–06

BG Pathum United
Thai League 1: 2020–21

References

External links

1987 births
Living people
Sportspeople from Salamanca
Spanish footballers
Footballers from Castile and León
Association football midfielders
Segunda División players
Segunda División B players
Tercera División players
Segunda Federación players
Tercera Federación players
UD Salamanca players
Granada CF footballers
Cádiz CF players
Hércules CF players
Deportivo Alavés players
CD Guijuelo footballers
Thai League 1 players
BG Pathum United F.C. players
Samut Prakan City F.C. players
Spanish expatriate footballers
Expatriate footballers in Thailand
Spanish expatriate sportspeople in Thailand